Monica Seles was the defending champion, but lost in quarterfinals to Jennifer Capriati.

Arantxa Sánchez Vicario won the title by defeating Gabriela Sabatini 6–1, 6–4 in the final.

Seeds
All seeded players received a bye into the second round.

Draw

Finals

Top half

Section 1

Section 2

Section 3

Section 4

Bottom half

Section 5

Section 6

Section 7

Section 8

References

External links
 Official results archive (ITF)
 Official results archive (WTA)

Lipton Championships - Women's Singles
Women's Singles